Harry "Buck" Cooper was an American soccer player who earned two caps, scoring one goal, with the U.S. national team in 1916. He played in the National Association Football League and American Soccer League.

International
On August 20, 1916, the U.S. national team played its first official international game, a 3–2 victory over Sweden in Sweden.  Cooper scored the third U.S. goal in the game in a solo run down the left side.  His second, and last, cap came in a 1–1 tie with Norway on September 3, 1916.

Club career
In 1914, Cooper played for Philadelphia Ranger.  In 1915, he played for Peabody F.C. in Philadelphia.  Peabody released him on January 7, 1916.  He then moved to Continentals F.C. of the New York State Amateur Foot Ball League.  That year, he moved to the New York Field Club in the semi-professional National Association Football League.  By 1919, he was with Paterson.  In 1920, he moved to Erie A.A. for one season.  In 1921, New York F.C. became an inaugural member of the professional American Soccer League and Cooper rejoined the team for two seasons.  He also played for the Newark Skeeters during the 1924-25 American Soccer League season.

References

External links

 

American soccer players
American Soccer League (1921–1933) players
Erie A.A. players
National Association Football League players
New York Field Club players
Newark Skeeters players
Paterson F.C. players
United States men's international soccer players
Year of birth missing
1963 deaths
Soccer players from Newark, New Jersey
Association football forwards